William Eliot, 2nd Earl of St Germans (1 April 1767 – 19 January 1845), known as William Elliot until 1823, was a British diplomat and politician.

Eliot was born at Port Eliot, Cornwall, the third son of Edward Craggs-Eliot, 1st Baron Eliot and his wife Catherine (née Elliston). He was educated at Pembroke College, Cambridge, taking an M.A. in 1786. He served as an officer with the East Cornwall Militia.

From November 1791 until 1793 he was a Secretary of Legation at Berlin, from 1793 to 1794 Secretary of Embassy and Minister Plenipotentiary at The Hague and from 1796 Minister Plenipotentiary to the Elector Palatine and to the Diet of Ratisbon. Eliot also sat as Tory Member of Parliament for St Germans from 1791 to 1802 and for Liskeard from 1802 to 1823. He served as a Lord of the Admiralty from 1800 to 1804, as Parliamentary Under-Secretary of State for Foreign Affairs from 1804 to 1805 and as one of the Lords Commissioners of the Treasury from 1807 to 1812.

In 1823 he succeeded his elder brother as second Earl of St Germans and entered the House of Lords.

Family
Lord St Germans married four times.

In November 1797 at Trentham, Staffordshire to Lady Georgiana Augusta Leveson-Gower (13 April 1769 – 24 March 1806). Georgiana was the daughter of Granville Leveson-Gower, 1st Marquess of Stafford. They had one son and three daughters:
Edward Granville Eliot, 3rd Earl of St Germans (29 August 1798 – 7 October 1877) - Lady Jemmima Cornwallis, dau.of Charles Cornwallis, 2nd Marquess Cornwallis
Lady Caroline Georgina Eliot (27 July 1799 – April 1865)
Lady Susan Caroline Eliot (12 April 1801 – 15 January 1835) - Henry Lygon, 4th Earl Beauchamp
Lady Charlotte Sophia Eliot (28 May 1802 – 8 July 1839)
On 13 February 1809 at Heytesbury, Wiltshire, to Letitia A'Court (9 August 1778 – 10 January 1810), with no issue.
On 7 March 1812 at the Earl of Powis' House, Berkeley Square, London, to Charlotte Robinson (1790 – 3 July 1813), with no issue.
On 20 August 1814 at Walton, Warwickshire, to Susan Mordaunt (d. 5 February 1830), with no issue.

He died at Port Eliot in 1845 and was succeeded by his eldest son.

References

External links

Saint Germans, William Eliot, 2nd Earl of
Saint Germans, William Eliot, 2nd Earl of
Saint Germans, William Eliot, 2nd Earl of
Saint Germans, William Eliot, 2nd Earl of
Saint Germans, William Eliot, 2nd Earl of
Earls of St Germans
Eliot, William, 2nd Earl of St Germans
Members of the Parliament of Great Britain for St Germans
British MPs 1790–1796
British MPs 1796–1800
Members of the Parliament of the United Kingdom for St Germans
UK MPs 1801–1802
UK MPs 1802–1806
UK MPs 1806–1807
UK MPs 1807–1812
UK MPs 1812–1818
UK MPs 1818–1820
UK MPs 1820–1826
Saint Germans, E2
Younger sons of barons
William Eliot
Ambassadors of Great Britain to the Netherlands
Members of the Parliament of the United Kingdom for Liskeard